Paseo Los Mochis, is a two-story shopping center located in Los Mochis, Sinaloa, México. The mall is anchored by a Liverpool department store, C&A, casino Play City and a 12-screen movie theater Cinemex. it opened in November 2008

External links 

debate.com.mx
 

Buildings and structures in Sinaloa
Shopping malls in Mexico
Shopping malls established in 2008
Los Mochis